Thalassoleon ("sea lion") is an extinct genus of large fur seal. Thalassoleon inhabited the Northern Pacific Ocean in latest Miocene and early Pliocene. Fossils of T. mexicanus are known from Baja California and southern California. T. macnallyae is known from central California, and T. inouei (which may be a synonym of T. macnallyae) is known from Japan. Thalassoleon could be the ancestor of the modern northern fur seal.

T. mexicanus was comparable in size to the largest modern fur seals, with an old-male skull length of 272 mm and an estimated minimal weight of 295–318 kg (650-700 lb). Holotype of T. macnallyae, UCMP 112809, is a male equal in size to T. mexicanus.

References

Miocene pinnipeds
Miocene mammals of North America
Miocene mammals of Asia
Prehistoric pinnipeds of North America
Fossil taxa described in 1977
Prehistoric carnivoran genera